The Rock Church of Auburn, Wyoming is a historic church building that has served also as a community center. Also known as Latter Day Saints Auburn Ward Meeting House, it is located in the public square at Second W and First S Sts. in Auburn. It was built in 1889 out of rough cut stone, rarely used in early Star Valley architecture. It is a steeply gabled structure, of size approximately 30 by 15 feet (9.1 m × 4.6 m). The church began construction in the summer, was hand-worked, and finished during the winter. The rectangular building stands unornamented beyond the texture of stone and an arch stating "Auburn Ward."  Construction of the building costed $2,980.00 at the time and the community was considered the wealthiest in the valley for some years after construction.

It was listed on the National Register of Historic Places (NRHP) in 1985.  At the time of its NRHP listing, it was significant as the only building from the 1800s still in regular use in the area, and as one of the very oldest buildings surviving in Star Valley.  Its NRHP nomination asserted that it "embodies the type, period, and method of construction utilized by early pioneers for buildings of major importance."  The Star Valley Historical Society intended to initiate restoration following its nomination.

See also
 The Church of Jesus Christ of Latter-day Saints in Wyoming
List of the oldest churches in the United States
 List of the oldest buildings in Wyoming

References 

Churches on the National Register of Historic Places in Wyoming
Churches completed in 1889
Buildings and structures in Lincoln County, Wyoming
Latter Day Saint movement in Wyoming
National Register of Historic Places in Lincoln County, Wyoming